Sigongli station is an interchange station on the Loop Line (heavy rail subway) and Line 3 (straddle beam monorail) of Chongqing Rail Transit in Chongqing Municipality, China. It is located in Nan'an District. It opened on 30 December 2011 with Line 3 and was expanded on 28 December 2018 with the Loop Line section of the station.

Station Structure

Line 3
An island platform is used for Line 3 trains travelling in both directions.

Loop line
An island platform is used for Loop line trains travelling in both directions.

References

Railway stations in Chongqing
Railway stations in China opened in 2011
Chongqing Rail Transit stations